Jill McGill (born January 30, 1972) is an American professional golfer who played on the LPGA Tour.

McGill was born in Denver, Colorado. She played college golf at the University of Southern California and won the U.S. Women's Amateur title in 1993 and the U.S. Women's Amateur Public Links in 1994. She played on the 1994 Curtis Cup team. She turned professional in December 1994.

McGill finished tied second at the 1995 Women's British Open, when it was co-sanctioned with the LPGA Tour and the Ladies European Tour, but not yet recognized as a major championship by the LPGA Tour. 

McGill scored her first professional win at the 2022 U.S. Senior Women's Open at age 50.

Personal life
McGill is married to Patrick Byerly. Her sister, Shelley O'Keefe, serves as her caddie. She has two children, a son and a daughter. McGill lives in Dallas, Texas.

Professional wins (1)

Legends Tour wins (1)

Team appearances
Amateur
Curtis Cup (representing the United States): 1994 (tie)

Professional
Lexus Cup (representing International team): 2005 (winners)

References

External links

American female golfers
LPGA Tour golfers
Winners of ladies' major amateur golf championships
Golfers from Denver
Golfers from San Diego
1972 births
Living people
21st-century American women